Hans Magnus Grepperud (born 10 May 1958) is a Norwegian competition rower and Olympic medalist.

He received a bronze medal in coxless pairs at the 1984 Summer Olympics in Los Angeles, together with Sverre Løken.

References

1958 births
Living people
Norwegian male rowers
Olympic rowers of Norway
Olympic bronze medalists for Norway
Rowers at the 1984 Summer Olympics
Olympic medalists in rowing
World Rowing Championships medalists for Norway
Medalists at the 1984 Summer Olympics